Everything in Between may refer to:

 Everything in Between (Matt Wertz album)
 Everything in Between (No Age album)
 Everything in Between (Freddy Mullins album), by Freddy Mullins
Everything in Between (2022 film)